Erik "The Red" Denmark (born about 1980) is an American competitive eater and a member of the International Federation of Competitive Eating. He lives in Seattle, Washington and is nicknamed after Erik the Red, who was a Viking that founded the first  Nordic settlement in Greenland.

Competition and records
Denmark competed in the 2007 Nathan's Hot Dog Eating Contest, placing 14th and eating 26 hot dogs with buns in 12 minutes. He placed 11th in 2006 eating 22 hot dogs.

 Native American fry bread: 9.75 fry breads in 8 minutes, October 28, 2006
 Hamburgers: 45 Krystal hamburgers in 8 minutes at the 2007 Krystal Square Off Finals, October 28, 2007
 Shrimp: 4 lb and 15 oz spot shrimp in 12 minutes, September 22, 2006

References

External links
 Erik Denmark - Bio at the International Federation of Competitive Eating website

1980s births
American competitive eaters
Living people
Sportspeople from Seattle